Vaman Mangesh Dubhashi , with the pen name "Rigvedi" or as "Rugvedi" was a Marathi poet and writer from Karwar, India.

Famous Works
Dubhashi had translated Rabindranath Tagore's Gitanjali into Marathi under the title "Abhang Gitanjali".

Hindu High School
Dubhashi was the founder and headmaster of Hindu High School located in Karwar.

Personal life
His maternal grandson was veteran Marathi writer and humorist P.L.Deshpande while his paternal grandson was Indian actor Satish Dubhashi.

References

Marathi-language writers
People from Karwar
People from Uttara Kannada
Konkani people
Translators of Rabindranath Tagore
Translators to Marathi